The Esslingen witch trials was a series of witch trials taking place in Esslingen in Germany between 1662 and 1666. It resulted in the death of 37 people. It was the first mass trial of sorcery in South Western Germany (a region previously known for its many witch trials) in thirty years, and it was also the first large witch trial in Württemberg, a state previously known for its moderation in witch craft persecution. Alongside the Reutlingen witch trials, which took place in parallel, it was the last mass witch trial in South Western Germany (as well as present-day Germany as a whole).

References 

 Midelfort, H. C. Erik, Witch hunting in southwestern Germany 1562-1684: the social and intellectual foundations, U.P, Stanford, Calif, 1972

1662 in the Holy Roman Empire
Witch trials in Germany
1663 in the Holy Roman Empire
1664 in the Holy Roman Empire
1665 in the Holy Roman Empire